Shivrai was a copper coin minted during the rule of Marathas and remained in circulation till the end of the 19th century, primarily in the Bombay Presidency region.

Before 1830s, shivrai was valued at 1/74 to 1/80 of a rupee. There are 150 different types of shivrai extant to date. In 1885, the British government ordered all local revenue collectors (Mamlatdars) to collect all shivrais and deposit them in treasury. The purpose of this was to bring the new pice, worth 1/64 of rupee, in currency by eliminating this native rival. In 1890, Rev. Abbott collected and studied around 25,000 shivrais. He mentions that they were still in circulation. The shivrai remained in circulation till the end of the 19th century.

Chatrapati Shivaji Maharaj Shivrai 

When the Maratha warrior Shivaji became Chhatrapati of the Maratha empire, as a symbol of sovereignty, the Rajyaabhisheka Shaka (The Coronation Era) was started. On the occasion of coronation, special coins were minted, including a gold coin called  Shivrai Hon. These coins have Shri Raja ShivaChhatrapati, in Devanagari, inscribed on them.

Dudandi Shivrai 

Dudandi Shivrais (Marathi: दुदांडी शिवराई) were minted during Peshwa period. Dudandi literally means two-bars. The "Shri" at the top of the obverse is underlined. This horizontal line, combined with the horizontal heading line of the word "Raja", gives us an impression of "Double bars", hence the term "Dudandi".

EIC's Shivrai 

The British East India Company minted Shivrais at Poona during the period of 1820-1830. Unlike Earlier Shivrais, these contained year of minting on it. The dotted collar of earlier Shivrais is also absent. The year was given in Fasli era.

References

History of India
Coins of India
Shivaji
Monuments and memorials to Shivaji
British East India Company